Albin Tahiri (born 15 February 1989) is a Kosovo Albanian World Cup alpine ski racer. He represented the Kosovo Olympic Committee for the first time in Winter Olympic Games in February 2018. Tahiri is a dentist by profession and he trained in Slovenia, Austria and Italy.

Early life
Tahiri was born in SR Slovenia from Kosovo Albanian father and Slovenian mother.

Career
He started skiing at the age of 7 in Slovenia. In June 2009, he changed his nationality and has since been competing in Kosovo. He was the first athlete to represent Kosovo at the Winter Olympics. He was the Kosovo's flag bearer during the Parade of Nations of the opening ceremony in Pyeongchang.

World Cup results

Results per discipline

Standings through 8 February 2021

World Championship results

Olympic results

References

External links
 
Profile at International Ski Federation
Profile at 2018 Winter Olympics

1989 births
Living people
Kosovan male alpine skiers
Olympic alpine skiers of Kosovo
Slovenian male alpine skiers
Slovenian people of Kosovan descent
Alpine skiers at the 2018 Winter Olympics
Alpine skiers at the 2022 Winter Olympics